Jeunesse Sportive de Libreville is a Gabonese football club based in Libreville, Gabon.

Performance in CAF competitions
CAF Cup Winners' Cup: 1 appearance
2003 – First Round

External links 

Libreville
Football clubs in Libreville
Libreville
2001 establishments in Gabon